The dithionate (or metabisulfate) anion, is a sulfur oxoanion derived from dithionic acid, H2S2O6.  Its chemical formula is sometimes written in a semistructural format, as [O3SSO3]2−. It is the first member of the polythionates.

The sulfur atoms of the dithionate ion are in the +5 oxidation state due to the presence of the S–S bond. Generally, dithionates form stable compounds that are not readily oxidised or reduced. Strong oxidants oxidise them to sulfates and strong reducing agents reduce them to sulfites and dithionites. Aqueous solutions of dithionates are quite stable and can be boiled without decomposition.

The γ-irradiation of crystalline dithionates produces  radical ions. The unpaired electron in the  radical can be detected with electron paramagnetic resonance and barium dithionate has been proposed as the basis for a radiation dosimeter.

The dithionate ion can act as a bidentate ligand.

The structure of the dithionate ion in the solid state is staggered in Na2S2O6·2H2O, whereas in the anhydrous potassium salt it is nearly eclipsed.

Compounds
Compounds containing the dithionate ion include:

 sodium dithionate, Na2S2O6
 potassium dithionite, K2S2O6
 barium dithionate, BaS2O6

References

External links

 
Sulfur oxyanions